Daniel Paul Rains (born April 26, 1956) is a former professional American football player who played linebacker for four seasons for the Chicago Bears.  He was a member of the Bears team that won Super Bowl XX following the 1985 NFL season.  He was also a member of the "Shuffling Crew" in the video The Super Bowl Shuffle.

Rains was the Fullback of fellow Hopewell teammate, Tony Dorsett of the Pittsburgh Panthers and Dallas Cowboys fame.

1956 births
Living people
American football linebackers
Chicago Bears players
Cincinnati Bearcats football players
People from Rochester, Pennsylvania
Ed Block Courage Award recipients